This is a list of districts in the London Borough of Richmond upon Thames:

 Barnes
 Castelnau
 East Sheen
 East Twickenham
 Fulwell
 Ham
 Hampton
 Hampton Hill
 Hampton Wick
 Kew
 Mortlake
 North Sheen
 Petersham
 Richmond
 St Margarets
 Strawberry Hill
 Teddington
 Twickenham
 Whitton

Lists of places in London